Edmonton Light Rail Transit, commonly referred to as the LRT, is a light rail system in Edmonton, Alberta. Part of the Edmonton Transit Service (ETS), the 21-kilometre Capital Line starts at Clareview in Edmonton's northeast and ends at Century Park in Edmonton's south end. A second route, the Metro Line to areas north of the downtown, opened on September 6, 2015. The Metro Line includes a  extension in the LRT system from Churchill LRT Station in downtown Edmonton northwest to NAIT LRT Station.

Lines and stations

Future stations

References

LRT stations
Lists of metro stations
Lists of railway stations in Canada
Lists of buildings and structures in Alberta
LRT stations